Cyana effracta is a moth of the family Erebidae first described by Francis Walker in 1854. It is found in Nepal, the north-eastern Himalayas, Taiwan, China, Burma, Peninsular Malaysia, Sumatra and Borneo.

The wingspan is 22–30 mm. Adults have a slightly translucent appearance. There are three pale red fasciae on the forewings, evenly spaced across the central part of the wing. The hindwings are white but with diffuse grey subbasal and submarginal bands and a discal spot.

The larvae possibly feed on Elettaria species.

Subspecies
Cyana effracta effracta
Cyana effracta posilla Wileman, 1910 (Taiwan, China, India, Nepal)

References

Moths described in 1854
Cyana